Ithaca, Ithake, or Ithaka was a Greek city on ancient Ithaca.

See also
List of cities in ancient Epirus

References

Populated places in ancient Ithaca
Former populated places in Greece